The papal conclave held from 2 to 6 February 1922 saw Cardinal Achille Ratti elected to succeed Benedict XV, who had died on 22 January 1922. It took fourteen ballots for the 53 of the 60 cardinals assembled in the Sistine Chapel to elect a new pope. Ratti took the name Pius XI and immediately revived the traditional public blessing from the balcony, Urbi et Orbi ("to the city and to the world"), which his predecessors had eschewed since the loss of Rome to the Italian state in 1870.

The four non-European cardinals did not participate in the conclave. Three of them arrived too late and one did not attempt the journey. Three weeks after his election, Pius XI issued rules extending the time between the death of a pope and the start of the conclave in order to increase the likelihood that cardinals from distant locations could participate in the next conclave.

Background
The previous five conclaves had produced a seesawing between conservatives and liberals, from the conservative Gregory XVI in 1831 to the initially liberal Pius IX. By the time of his death in 1878 Pius IX had become a reactionary conservative and he was succeeded by the liberal Leo XIII, who on his death was succeeded by the populist conservative Pius X. In 1914 the liberal Benedict XV was elected.

At the death of Benedict XV there were 61 members of the College of Cardinals. Enrique Almaraz y Santos, the archbishop of Toledo, died the same day. Three of the remaining 60 cardinals did not attend the conclave for reasons of health: José María Martín de Herrera y de la Iglesia, Giuseppe Antonio Ermenegildo Prisco, and Lev Skrbenský z Hříště. Joaquim Arcoverde de Albuquerque Cavalcanti of São Sebastião do Rio de Janeiro knew he could not reach Rome in time for the conclave and did not attempt the journey. The other three non-European cardinals–William Henry O'Connell of Boston, Denis Dougherty of Philadelphia, and Louis-Nazaire Bégin of Québec City–did not arrive in time to participate in the conclave.

Two-thirds of the non-Italian cardinals and some of the Italians wanted to delay the start of the conclave until at least one of the Americans arrived. Cardinal János Csernoch of Hungary told the other cardinals that "America is a vital part of the Church. It will be calamitous to deny her participation in the election of the Pontiff. It will have a grave reaction among the American people; it will wound their pride and dignity." Cardinal Friedrich Gustav Piffl opposed proceeding without the Americans "for the sake of a technicality". The 53 cardinals who entered the conclave on 2 February, the eleventh day following the death of Benedict XV as required, were 31 Italians, five French, four Spanish, three German, 3 British, 2 Polish, 2 Austrian, one Hungarian, one Belgian and one Dutch.

Balloting
The 1922 conclave was the most divided conclave in many years. While two of the previous three conclaves had lasted three days or less, the 1922 conclave lasted for five days. It took fourteen ballots for Achille Ratti, the archbishop of Milan, to reach the two-thirds majority needed for election. He had been made a cardinal and appointed archbishop of Milan just eight months earlier after a long academic career and less than three years in the diplomatic service of the Holy See.

At the conclave, the College of Cardinals was divided into two factions. One conservative faction known as the "irreconcilables", and "integrationists" led by the secretary of the Holy Office, Cardinal Rafael Merry del Val, favored the policies and style of Pope Pius X. The other more conciliatory faction favoring the style and policies of Benedict XV was led by the Cardinal-Camerlengo Pietro Gasparri, who had served as Benedict's secretary of state.

No ballots were taken on the first day. Four ballots were taken on each of the succeeding days, two in the morning and two in the afternoon. Gasparri approached Ratti before voting began on the third day and told him he would urge his supporters to switch their votes to Ratti, who was shocked to hear this. When it became clear that neither Gasparri nor del Val could win, the cardinals approached Ratti, thinking him a compromise candidate not identified with either faction. Cardinal Gaetano de Lai approached Ratti and was believed to have said: "We will vote for Your Eminence if Your Eminence will promise that you will not choose Cardinal Gasparri as your secretary of state." Ratti is said to have responded: "I hope and pray that among so highly deserving cardinals the Holy Spirit selects someone else. If I am chosen, it is indeed Cardinal Gasparri whom I will take to be my secretary of state." As anticipated, Gasparri's recognition that he could not be elected and his consequent support of Ratti allowed him to remain secretary of state until he retired in 1930.

Ratti was elected pope on the conclave's fourteenth ballot on 6 February reportedly receiving 38 votes. The Cardinal Dean Vincenzo Vannutelli, the protopriest Michael Logue and the protodeacon Gaetano Bisleti approached Ratti and Cardinal Vannutelli asked if he accepted his election. Ratti replied: "It is God's will." When pressed for a more explicit answer he replied "As it is God's will, it cannot be refused. Since it is the will of God I must obey." Vannutelli asked the new pope by what name he would be called. Ratti chose "Pius XI", explaining that Pius IX was the pope of his youth and Pius X had appointed him head of the Vatican Library. According to The New York Times, Ratti also told the cardinals he chose the name Pius because "he wanted a Pius to end the Roman question which had begun under a Pius".

Shortly afterwards white smoke rose from the Sistine Chapel chimney and at around 12:30 p.m. Gaetano Bisleti, the cardinal-protodeacon appeared on the central balcony of St. Peter's Basilica and announced the election of Ratti as Pope Pius XI.

Blessing

As his first act as pope, Pius XI revived the traditional public blessing from the balcony, Urbi et Orbi, ("to the city and to the world"), abandoned by his predecessors since the loss of Rome to the Italian state in 1870. This suggested his openness to a rapprochement with the government of Italy. He had earlier given indication of this to the cardinals at the conclave when he explained his choice of name ("a Pius to end the Roman question which had begun under a Pius") and his informing them that he would give the blessing in public from the central balcony.  When some of the more conservative cardinals tried to persuade him not to give the blessing from the external balcony, he listened to their arguments for a while and overruled their objections by saying: "Remember, I am no longer a Cardinal. I am the Supreme Pontiff now". Also, at Pius XI's first appearance, the banner draped on the balcony displayed the arms of Pius IX—the pope who lost Rome to Italy—rather than the arms of his immediate predecessor, Benedict XV.

Shortly after the blessing was imparted, Prince Ludovico Chigi Albani della Rovere, the Marshal of the Conclave, issued a statement by order of the secretary of the conclave:

It was rumoured that immediately after the election, he decided to appoint Pietro Gasparri as his cardinal secretary of state.  The contemporary report by The New York Times on the following day 7 February appears to confirm this as it reported that Gasparri, who had served as Benedict XV's secretary of state, was reappointed by the new pope and the reappointment was announced almost immediately after the new pope assumed his pontificate.  The Pope also received the diplomatic corps and the Papal aristocracy in an audience later in the afternoon.

Pius XI was crowned on 12 February. Unlike his immediate predecessor, who had his coronation in the Sistine Chapel, Pius' coronation took place in the dais in front of the high altar in Saint Peter's Basilica.

New rule for scheduling a conclave 
Immediately following the conclave, the fact that the cardinals had disputed delaying the conclave to await the arrival of the Americans was openly discussed. On 8 February, four French cardinals, Louis Luçon of Rheims, Louis-Ernest Dubois of Paris, Pierre Andrieu of Bordeaux, and Louis-Joseph Maurin of Lyon, asked for changes to church law to allow for an indefinite delay to ensure participation by cardinals for North and South America. And Cardinal Pietro Gasparri, who had led the Italians in opposition to a delay, expressed support for some modification of the schedule.

On 28 February Pope Pius met with Cardinal O'Connell and said: "There will be no more racing 5,000 miles in a vain endeavor to reach Rome in time for a Conclave. The United States is too important to be ignored as she has been. I shall see to it that what happened at the last Conclave shall not occur again."

Pius XI issued new regulations in Cum Proxime on 1 March 1922. He noted the experience of the conclave that elected him and that cardinals had requested modifications. He set the start of the conclave at ten to fifteen days from the death of the pope and allowed the cardinals to extend that to as long as eighteen days. It had taken the American cardinals from fifteen (6 February) to eighteen days (9 February) to arrive in Rome.

For the 1939 papal conclave, the college waited the maximum eighteen days.

See also
Cardinal electors for the 1922 papal conclave

Notes

References

Sources

Further reading

1922 in Italy
1922 elections in Europe
1920s in Rome
1922
20th-century Catholicism
1922 in Christianity
February 1922 events